iPhone OS 2 is the second major release of the iOS mobile operating system developed by Apple Inc., being the successor to iPhone OS 1.  It was the first release of iOS to support third-party applications via the App Store. iPhone OS 2.2.1 was the final version of iPhone OS 2. It was succeeded by iPhone OS 3 on June 17, 2009.

iPhone OS 2.0 became available on July 11, 2008 with the release of the iPhone 3G. Devices running iPhone OS 1 are upgradable to this version. This version of iOS introduces the App Store, making third-party applications available to the iPhone and iPod Touch. Prior to the public release of iPhone OS 2.0, Apple held a keynote event to announce the iPhone OS Software Development Kit ("SDK") to developers. Originally it was called 1.2.

Apps

 Text
 YouTube
 Clock
 iTunes

 Calendar
 Stocks
 Calculator
 App Store

 Photos
 Maps
 Notes

 Camera
 Weather
 Settings
 Videos (iPod Touch exclusive)

Dock

 Phone

 Mail

 Safari

 iPod

History 

iPhone OS 2 was introduced at the Apple Worldwide Developers Conference keynote address on June 9, 2008.
iPhone OS 2.0 was released on July 11, 2008. It was released along with the iPhone 3G, and ran on the first-generation iPhone as well.

Features

App Store 

The most notable feature of iPhone OS 2 was the App Store. Before this feature was introduced, the only way to install custom applications on the device was via jailbreaking, which is strongly discouraged and unsupported by Apple. There were 500 applications available for download at the launch of the App Store, though this amount has grown dramatically since then. Now, the App Store has more than 4 million apps and games as of 2021.

Mail 
The Mail app had a makeover, having push-emails that provide an always-on capability. It also supports Microsoft Office attachments, as well as iWork attachments. Other new features including support for BCC, multiple email delete, and the ability to select an outgoing email.

Contacts 
The Contacts app now has a new home screen icon that is only available on iPod Touch. Along with the release is the ability to search contacts without being searched one-by-one, as well as SIM contacts import ability.

Maps 
New features were added to the Maps app in the iPhone OS 2.2 software update. Among the features added are the inclusion of Google Street View, directions to public transit and while walking, and the ability to display the address of a dropped pin.

Calculator 
When the device is in landscape mode, the calculator app displays a scientific calculator. Also, the app icon is updated.

Settings 
Settings now has an ability to turn Wi-Fi back on while in Airplane mode, as well as the ability to turn on/off Location Services.

Reception 
Rene Ritchie at iMore said, "Overall, iPhone Firmware 2.0 is a stunning achievement that really puts the iPhone on par with the Apple II and Mac as one of the great revolutions in modern technology. It takes it beyond simple Phone + iPod, or even smartphone, and makes it the leading contender for the next great shift in computing." However, they criticized it for having stability issues and overall sluggishness. Macworld said, "The iPhone 2.0 software is full of the kind of refinements that you'd expect from a second-generation Apple product. The iPhone OS still isn't perfect, and we wish Apple has addressed some lingering shortcomings, but it's a welcome step-up for what was already arguably the best mobile platform on the market."

iPod Touch price
The update from iPhone OS 1.x to iPhone OS 2.0 cost $9.95 for iPod touch users; it was free for iPhone users. This was mandatory under the Sarbanes-Oxley Act, which has been since revised. Upgrades to iPhone OS 2.1 or 2.2 from iPhone OS 2.0 were free for iPod touch users.

Supported devices

iPhone
iPhone (1st generation)
iPhone 3G

iPod Touch
iPod Touch (1st generation)
iPod Touch (2nd generation)

Version history

References

External links 
 

2
2008 software
Products introduced in 2008
Mobile operating systems
Proprietary operating systems